The 2021–22 season was the 64th season in the existence of FC Rubin Kazan and the club's 19th consecutive season in the top flight of Russian football. In addition to the domestic league, Rubin Kazan are participating in this season's editions of the Russian Cup and the inaugural season of the UEFA Europa Conference League.

Season events
On 27 May, Rubin Kazan announced the signing of Sead Hakšabanović from IFK Norrköping to a five-year contract.

On 11 June, Rubin Kazan announced the signing of Konstantin Nizhegorodov from Hansa Rostock.

On 20 June, Rubin Kazan announced the permanent signing of Oliver Abildgaard from AaB on a contract until June 2024.

On 30 June, Rubin Kazan announced the signing of Ivan Savitskiy from Leningradets Leningrad Oblast to a four-year contract, and the signing of Vladislav Ignatyev from Lokomotiv Moscow to a one-year contract.

On 9 August, Rubin Kazan announced the signing of Montassar Talbi from Benevento to a four-year contract.

On 28 August, Rubin Kazan announced the signing of Anders Dreyer from Midtjylland to a five-year contract.

On 31 August, Darko Jevtić left Rubin Kazan to join AEK Athens on a season-long loan deal.

On 1 September, German Onugkha joined Rubin Kazan on loan from Vejle, with an option to make the move permanent, having started the season on loan at Krylia Sovetov.

On 3 September, Silvije Begić joined Krylia Sovetov on loan for the season.

On 18 November, Oleg Shatov left Rubin after his contract was terminated by mutual consent.

On 13 December, Rubin announced the signing of Marat Apshatsev from Tom Tomsk.

On 29 December, Rubin announced the signing of Aleksandr Lomovitsky from Spartak Moscow, whilst Danil Stepanov moved permanently to Arsenal Tula.

On 21 January, Rubin announced the signing of Vitaly Lisakovich from Lokomotiv Moscow on a contract until the summer of 2025.

On 17 February, Yegor Teslenko signed for Rubin from KAMAZ Naberezhnye Chelny.

On 20 February, Rubin announced the signing of Daniil Kuznetsov from Zenit St.Petersburg.

On 11 March, Rubin suspended their contracts with Anders Dreyer and Sead Hakšabanović until the summer of 2022. On 13 March, Filip Uremović also suspended his contract with Rubin until the summer of 2022.

On 24 March, Khvicha Kvaratskhelia suspended his contract with Rubin until the summer of 2022, and then joined Dinamo Batumi. On 26 March, Silvije Begić also suspended his contract with Rubin.

On 3 April, Hwang In-beom also suspended his contract with Rubin until the summer of 2022.

Squad

Contract suspensions

On loan

Transfers

In

Loans in

Out

Loans out

Contract suspensions

Released

Friendlies

Competitions

Overall record

Premier League

League table

Results summary

Results by round

Matches

Russian Cup

UEFA Europa Conference League

Third qualifying round

Squad statistics

Appearances and goals

|-
|colspan="14"|Players who suspended their contracts:

|-
|colspan="14"|Players away from the club on loan:

|-
|colspan="14"|Players who left Rubin Kazan during the season:

|}

Goal scorers

Clean sheets

Disciplinary record

References

FC Rubin Kazan seasons
Rubin Kazan
2021–22 UEFA Europa Conference League participants seasons